Louis Marcellus Nagelsen (born Louis Marcellus Nagelsisen) (June 29, 1887 – October 21, 1965) was a Major League Baseball catcher who played for one season. He played for the Cleveland Naps for two games during the 1912 Cleveland Naps season. He attended the University of Notre Dame.

External links

1887 births
1965 deaths
Major League Baseball catchers
Cleveland Naps players
Notre Dame Fighting Irish baseball players
Kalamazoo Celery Pickers players
New Orleans Pelicans (baseball) players
Waterbury Contenders players
Baseball players from Ohio